Draper House may refer to:

In the United States ordered by state
 Draper House (Milford, Delaware), listed on the National Register of Historic Places (NRHP) in Delaware
Draper-Adkins House, listed on the NRHP in Milton, Delaware
 Draper House (Lima, New York), listed on the NRHP in Livingston County, New York
John William Draper House, listed on the NRHP in Hastings-on-Hudson, New York
Draper-Steadman House, listed on the NRHP in Riverton, Utah